Rachel Jane Brooking (born 18 October 1975) is a New Zealand Member of Parliament for the Labour Party. She first became an MP at the 2020 New Zealand general election. She is a lawyer by profession.

Biography
Brooking has a double degree in ecology and law from the University of Otago.

Prior to entering Parliament, Brooking worked as a lawyer. She specialised in environmental, resource management and local government law, and worked for a period for the Parliamentary Commissioner for the Environment in Wellington before returning to Dunedin to practice law with Anderson Lloyd. In 2019, Brooking was appointed to a government panel charged with reviewing the Resource Management Act 1991. She was previously the chair of the Otago/Southland branch of the Resource Management Law Association.

Brooking became a student activist in 1994, her first year at university, protesting against education minister Lockwood Smith due to excessively high student fees. Later she was voted president of the Otago University Students' Association in 1997. In 2010, Brooking was appointed to the board of University Book Shop (Otago) Ltd, and in 2019 to the board of Dunedin International Airport.

Political career

At the  Brooking stood for Parliament for the Labour Party. She hoped to be Labour's candidate for the  electorate, later renamed Taieri, but Labour selected Ingrid Leary instead. Brooking was ranked 46 on the party list, which was a high enough ranking to enter Parliament. The day after the election was also her birthday. In her first term, she was appointed deputy chair of the environment committee and the regulations review committee.

The day after Dunedin MP David Clark announced his upcoming retirement, Brooking said she would be seeking nomination to be the Labour candidate for the electorate in 2023. She was successful and selected to stand in the seat.

Personal life
Brooking is married to Dr Chris Jackson, a cancer specialist/oncologist who was the medical director for the Cancer Society of New Zealand. They have three children.  Her father  is an emeritus history professor and retired lecturer at the University of Otago.

References 

1975 births
Living people
University of Otago alumni
21st-century New Zealand politicians
21st-century New Zealand women politicians
New Zealand Labour Party MPs
New Zealand list MPs
Members of the New Zealand House of Representatives
Candidates in the 2020 New Zealand general election
New Zealand women lawyers
21st-century New Zealand lawyers